The Pacific Tsunami Museum (originally, the Hilo Tsunami Museum) is a museum in Hilo, Hawaii dedicated to the history of the April 1, 1946 Pacific tsunami and the May 23, 1960 Chilean tsunami which devastated much of the east coast of the Big Island, especially Hilo.  The museum also has a mission to educate people in general about tsunamis, including the 2004 Indian Ocean earthquake and tsunami. It is located at 130 Kamehameha Avenue, at the intersection of Kamehameha and Kalakaua in downtown Hilo.

One of the founders of the museum, Dr. Walter Dudley, serves as Chairman of the museum's Scientific Advisory Council.

History

The museum traces its origins to 1988, when Dr. Walter Dudley, a professor at the University of Hawaii–Hilo, was soliciting survivor stories from the community for his book Tsunami!. Dr. Dudley would later publish additional chronicles of tsunami survivors.

Jeanne Branch Johnston, a tsunami survivor, decided there was a need for a tsunami museum in 1993 and formed a steering committee; she and Dr. Dudley co-founded the museum that year. The museum was incorporated in August 1994; partners include the International Tsunami Information Center, the Pacific Tsunami Warning Center, the University of Hawaiʻi (both the Hilo and Manoa campuses), and State and County Civil Defense Agencies. Early solicitations for fundraising were for the Hilo Tsunami Museum. Johnston, Dudley, and Michael Childers began compiling an oral history of tsunami survivors from Hawaii, Alaska, India, Sri Lanka, Thailand, and the Maldives, with more than 450 survivor stories archived at the museum.

On May 22, 1997, First Hawaiian Bank announced it would donate its Kamehameha Branch building as the permanent site for the museum. The building, originally completed in 1930 to a design by local architect Charles W. Dickey, was turned over to the museum in December, and the museum opened to the public in June 1998. Funds for the renovation were provided in part by the Federal Emergency Management Agency under its Hazard Mitigation Grant Program. Previously, temporary exhibits were shown at the nearby S. H. Kress & Co. building.

Donna Saiki (née Weiss), who was the principal at Hilo High School from 1988 to 1996, also served as the first volunteer Executive Director of the museum starting in 1994 until June 2013. Saiki recruited members, volunteers, and donors; her husband Ronald was a youth sports coach in Keaukaha. Marlene Murray succeeded Saiki as the executive director in June 2013. The museum building was retrofitted with photovoltaic arrays in 2014. A new science room was added in April 2016.

The museum closed temporarily due to the COVID-19 pandemic in Hawaii, and is scheduled to reopen in summer 2021. Several exhibits will be renovated and expanded by the time the museum reopens.

References

External links

 
 

1993 establishments in Hawaii
Museums established in 1993
Natural history museums in Hawaii
Museums in Hilo, Hawaii
Science museums in Hawaii
Natural disaster museums